Cambodia–France relations are the bilateral relations between the Kingdom of Cambodia and the French Republic. Cambodia was a protectorate of France from 11 August 1863 to 9 November 1953. King Norodom approached the French in 1861, in an attempt to stop neighbors Thailand and Vietnam from swallowing Cambodia's land.

History 
 
A treaty was signed in 1863 by King Norodom and was approved by his counterpart Napoleon III. Cambodia officially became a protectorate of the French empire on 11 August 1863. Cambodia gained its independence in November 1953, thanks to Prince Norodom Sihanouk.

France and Cambodia enjoy close relations, stemming partly from the days of the French Protectorate and partly from the role played by France in the signing of the peace agreements in Paris in 1991, and further cemented by the French language. These relations are gradually adapting to Cambodia's growing integration into its regional environment and its progress towards the status of a Middle Income Country, hopefully by 2020. The "Orientation and Cooperation Document" signed in 2010, steers our cooperation towards the following goal: "supporting economic growth and job creation in Cambodia by developing human capital and promoting French private investment".

French president Charles de Gaulle visited Cambodia in 1966 and was given a warm welcome by Prince Norodom Sihanouk.

French assistance

France was part of the United Nations Transitional Authority in Cambodia.

Migration
France has one of the largest Cambodian diaspora communities outside the United States, largely because of the refugees who fled Cambodia who escaped the Khmer Rouge in the 1970s. As of 2015, there are around 80,000 Cambodians living in France. A Cambodian restaurant Le Petit Cambodge was among the sites of the November 2015 Paris attacks, though it is unclear whether any Cambodians were among those killed.

See also 
 Little Cambodia
 Indians in Cambodia
 Cambodian People's Party
 French language in Cambodia

Notes and references 

 
Bilateral relations of France
France
Relations of colonizer and former colony